Elli Terwiel (born April 16, 1989 in New Westminster, British Columbia) is a Canadian specializing in slalom skiing. She represented Canada in this event at the 2014 Winter Olympics and also skied collegiately at the University of Vermont. Terwiel currently resides in Sun Peaks, British Columbia.

References

External links
 
 

1989 births
Living people
Canadian female alpine skiers
Sportspeople from British Columbia
Alpine skiers at the 2014 Winter Olympics
Olympic alpine skiers of Canada
University of Vermont alumni
Vermont Catamounts skiers
20th-century Canadian women
21st-century Canadian women